Sapintus fulvipes is a species of antlike flower beetles in the family Anthicidae. It is found in the Caribbean and North America.

Taxonomic note:
Chandler (1999) determined that the publication date of LaFerté's Monographie des Anthicus is probably May, 1849.

References

 Chandler, Donald S. (1999). "Publication Dates of Papers on the Anthicidae (Coleoptera) by the Marquis F. T. de LaFerté-Sénectère". Transactions of the American Entomological Society, vol. 125, no. 4, 433–439.
 LaFerté-Sénectère, M. F. de la (1849). Monographie des Anthicus et Genres Voisins, Coléoptères Hétéromères de la Tribu des Trachélides, xxiv + 340.
 Werner, F. G. (1962). "A Revision of the Nearctic Species of Sapintus (Coleoptera: Anthicidae)". Annals of the Entomological Society of America, vol. 55, no. 5, 492–498.

Further reading

 Arnett, R. H. Jr., M. C. Thomas, P. E. Skelley and J. H. Frank. (eds.). (21 June 2002). American Beetles, Volume II: Polyphaga: Scarabaeoidea through Curculionoidea. CRC Press LLC, Boca Raton, Florida .
 Arnett, Ross H. (2000). American Insects: A Handbook of the Insects of America North of Mexico. CRC Press.
 Richard E. White. (1983). Peterson Field Guides: Beetles. Houghton Mifflin Company.

External links

 NCBI Taxonomy Browser, Sapintus fulvipes

Anthicidae
Beetles described in 1849